Perkins is a surname derived from the Anglo-Saxon corruption of the kin of Pierre (from Pierre kin to Pierrekin to Perkins), introduced into England by the Norman Conquest. It is found throughout mid- and southern England.

Another derivation comes from the Welsh Perthyn, relative or belonging to a particular person or family, and also thought to be the Anglicized form of Peredur, from medieval Welsh.

Notable people with the surname 
Al Perkins, American guitarist
Annie Stevens Perkins (1868–1911), American writer
Anthony Perkins (1932–1992), American actor
Benjamin Douglas Perkins (1774–1810), American, son of Elisha Perkins, bookseller and propagandist of therapy with "Perkins tractors"
Bill Perkins (disambiguation), several people
Bishop Perkins (1787–1866), member of New York State Assembly, later congressional Representative from New York
Bishop W. Perkins (1841–1894), U.S. Representative and Senator from Kansas
Brian Perkins, New Zealander anchor and newsreader on BBC Radio 4
Bryce Perkins (born 1996), American football player
Broderick Perkins (born 1954), American baseball player
Carl Perkins (1932–1998), American singer-songwriter
Carl Christopher Perkins, politician, Kentucky Representative
Carl Dewey Perkins (1912–1984), politician, Kentucky Representative
Charles A. Perkins, American lawyer
Charles Callahan Perkins (1823–1886), American art critic and author
Charles L. Perkins, technology author
Charles N. Perkins, Australian football and political figure
Charles S. Perkins, American baseball player
Charlotte Perkins Gilman (1860–1935), American sociologist, writer and feminist
Cyril Perkins (1911–2013), English cricketer and centenarian
Darius Perkins (1964–2019), Australian actor
Daryl Perkins, Australian track cyclist
Don Perkins, National Football League running back for the Dallas Cowboys
Doron Perkins, American professional basketball player, 2009 Israeli Basketball Premier League MVP
Edward J. Perkins, U.S. Ambassador to the United Nations
Edwin Perkins (disambiguation), several people
Elisha Perkins (1741–1799), American physician
Elizabeth Perkins, American actress
Emily Perkins, Canadian actress
Emily Perkins (novelist), New Zealand author
Emily Pitkin Perkins, wife of Connecticut Governor and US Senator Roger Sherman Baldwin
Flo Perkins, American glass artist
Frances Perkins (1880–1965), American workers-rights advocate and U.S. Secretary of Labor
Frank Perkins (disambiguation), several people
Frederic Beecher Perkins (1828–1899), American editor, librarian and writer
Geoffrey Perkins (1953–2008), British comedy producer, writer, and performer
George Perkins (disambiguation), several people
Gil Perkins, Australian film and television actor
Henry Perkins (cricketer) (1832–1916), English cricketer and cricket administrator
Henry Farnham Perkins (1877–1956), American zoologist and eugenicist
Ian Perkins, American musician/guitarist now in the band The Horrible Crowes
Isabel Weld Perkins (1876–1948), American socialite and philanthropist
Jack Perkins (disambiguation), several people
Jacob Perkins (1766–1849), American engineer and inventor: bank-note engraving, engravings transfer, bathometer, pleometer
Jacqueline Perkins (born 1965), Australian long-distance runner
Jacqueline Perkins (diplomat), British diplomat and ambassador
James Perkins (disambiguation), several people
Janet Russell Perkins (1853–1933), American botanist
Jason Perkins (born 1992), Filipino-Canadian basketball player
John Perkins (disambiguation), several people
Josh Perkins (born 1995), American basketball player in the Israeli Basketball Premier League
Kathleen Rose Perkins (born 1974), American actress
Kendrick Perkins (born 1984), American basketball player
Kieren Perkins, Australian Olympic gold medal swimmer
Larry Perkins, Australian Formula One race car driver
Laurence Perkins, British classical bassoonist
Loftus Perkins, (1834–1891), English engineer
Luther Perkins, (1928–1968), American guitarist, backing guitarist for Johnny Cash
Marlin Perkins, American ecologist and naturalist
Maxwell Perkins, American editor for F. Scott Fitzgerald, Ernest Hemingway, Thomas Wolfe
Michael J. Perkins, American Medal of Honor recipient
Millie Perkins, American film and television actor
Niles Perkins (1919–1971), American athlete and physician
Osgood Perkins (1892–1937), American actor
Paul Perkins (born 1994), American football player
Pinetop Perkins (1913–2011), American blues pianist
Polly Perkins (born 1943), British actress, singer and writer
Ray Perkins (1941–2020), American football coach and former player
Reginald Perkins (1955–2009), American serial killer
Robbie Perkins (born 1994), Australian professional baseball player
Rodney Perkins (born 1936), physician and entrepreneur
Ronnie Perkins (born 1999), American football player
Sam Perkins (born 1961), National Basketball Association player
Samuel E. Perkins (1811–1879), Justice of the Indiana Supreme Court
Sarah Maria Clinton Perkins (1824-1905), American social reformer, newspaper editor
Shane Perkins, Australian track cyclist
Stephanie Perkins, American author
Stephen Perkins, American musician, drummer, and songwriter with Jane's Addiction
Sue Perkins, British television presenter, actress, comedian and writer
Tegwen Perkins (born 1955), Welsh golfer
Tex Perkins, Australian singer-songwriter
Toby Perkins UK Labour Party MP and politician 
Thomas Perkins (cricketer) (1870–1946), English cricketer, footballer and schoolmaster
Thomas Handasyd Perkins (1764–1854), American businessman and philanthropist
Tom Perkins, American businessman, founder/principal of Kleiner Perkins
Tony Perkins (politician), American pastor, politician and activist
Tony Perkins (news anchor), American broadcast journalist, radio personality, and former weathercaster
Tracy Perkins, court-martialed US Army sergeant
Troy Perkins, American soccer player for the Portland Timbers
Warren Perkins (1922–2014), American professional basketball player
Wayne Perkins, lead session guitarist for The Rolling Stones, Bob Marley, Everly Brothers and others
William Perkins (disambiguation), several people

Fictional characters 
 Ma Perkins, star of the radio soap opera from 1933 to 1960
 Perkins, character in the Harry Potter books
 Ann Perkins, in the NBC sitcom Parks and Recreation
Emma Perkins, protagonist in the musical The Guy Who Didn't Like Musicals
 Harry Perkins, principal character in the novel and TV adaptation A Very British Coup
 Perch Perkins, a news anchorman in the TV series SpongeBob SquarePants
 Polly Perkins, a servant maid unsuccessfully wooed by a milkman, whom she rejected for "the bow-legged conductor of a tuppenny bus", in the 1864 musical-hall song Pretty Polly Perkins of Paddington Green
Polly Perkins, protagonist of American comic strip Polly and Her Pals

See also
 Perkins Engines, a UK-based diesel engine manufacturer
 Perkins Restaurant and Bakery, a North American restaurant chain
Perkin (disambiguation)
 Perkin (surname)
 Parkin (surname)
 Parkins

English-language surnames
Surnames of English origin
Patronymic surnames
Surnames from given names